The 2017 Colonial Athletic Association football season was the 11th season of football for the Colonial Athletic Association (CAA) and part of the 2017 NCAA Division I FCS football season.

Previous season

Head coaches

Records are from before start of 2017 season

Preseason poll results
First place votes in parentheses

Rankings

Regular season

All times Eastern time.

Rankings reflect that of the STATS FCS poll for that week.

Week One

Players of the week:

Week Two

Players of the week:

Week Three

Players of the week:

Week Four

Players of the week:

Week Five

Players of the week:

Week Six

Players of the week:

Week Seven

Players of the week:

Week Eight

Players of the week:

Week Nine

Players of the week:

Week Ten

Players of the week:

Week Eleven

Players of the week:

Week Twelve

Players of the week:

FCS Playoffs

Postseason Awards

Coach of the Year – Curt Cignetti (Elon)
Offensive Player of the Year – Kyle Lauletta, SR, QB (Richmond)
Defensive Player of the Year – Andrew Ankrah, SR, DL (James Madison)
Special Teams Player of the Year – John Miller, SR, PR (James Madison)
Offensive Rookie of the Year – Davis Cheek, FR, QB (Elon)
Defensive Rookie of the Year – Colby Reeder, FR, LB (Delaware)
Chuck Boone Leadership Award – Bryan Schor, SR, QB (James Madison)

All–Conference Teams

Records against other conferences

Attendance

References